Nidulariopsis is a genus of fungi in the family Geastraceae.

External links
Index Fungorum

Geastraceae
Agaricomycetes genera